Rock Slyde is a 2009 American comedy film written and directed by Chris Dowling on his feature-length directorial debut. and produced by Will Wallace, Josh Young, and Milan Chakraborty. This independent production stars Patrick Warburton, Andy Dick, Rena Sofer, and Elaine Hendrix.

Premise
Rock Slyde Is a clumsy private detective, helped by his assistant Judy Bee. Slyde is trying to protect Sara Lee, a seductive baker, from a mysterious stalker, while contending with cult leader Bart and his followers, the Bartologists, who are trying to take over Slyde's office space.

Cast
 Patrick Warburton as Rock Slyde
 Andy Dick as Bart
 Rena Sofer as Sara Lee
 Elaine Hendrix as Judy Bee
 Jamie Alexander as Martin
 Terry Chen as David

The film featured numerous actors in brief cameos as members of the Bart cult, as members of the Pirates, or in other roles, including:
 Jason Alexander as Stan, The Mailman
 Tom Bergeron as Randy Wonder
 Eric Roberts as Jake, The Deliveryman
 Lea Thompson as Master Bartologist
 Jerry Cantrell as Himself
 Brian Bosworth as The Friendly Pirate
 Kristin Holt as The Bartender
 Guillermo Rodriguez as Gary
 Billy Unger as Young Rock

References

External links 

2009 films
2009 comedy films
American comedy films
2000s English-language films
2000s American films